Richard Hu Bellamy (December 3, 1927–March 29, 1998), was an American art dealer, known as Dick Bellamy. 

Dick Bellamy was born in Cincinnati in 1927, the son of a doctor father, who met his future wife at medical school. He ran New York's Green Gallery, from 1960 until 1965 an art gallery at 15 West 57th Street in Manhattan. He then ran the Noah Goldowsky Gallery on upper Madison Avenue for a few years. Bellamy attended the University of Ohio in Cincinnati for one semester. In 1949 he visited Provincetown, Massachusetts and its summer art colony. He moved to New York in the early 1950s eventually working as director of the Hansa Gallery, a cooperative gallery that included members Allan Kaprow, Alfred Leslie, George Segal, Richard Stankiewicz, Jean Follett, Robert Whitman and Jan Müller.

References

Further reading
 Eric La Prade. Breaking Through: Richard Bellamy and the Green Gallery 1960-1965: Twenty-Three Interviews. New York: Midmarch Arts Press, 2010. 
Judith Stein. Eye of the Sixties: Richard Bellamy and the Transformation of Modern Art. New York: Farrar, Straus and Giroux. 2016. 
  Miles Bellamy, ed. Serious Bidness: The Letters of Richard Bellamy . New York: Near Fine Press, 2016. 

1927 births
1998 deaths
American art dealers
American art historians